(Indigo and the Forty Thieves) is an operetta composed by Johann Strauss II to a German libretto by Maximilian Steiner based on the tale "Ali Baba and the Forty Thieves" from The Book of One Thousand and One Nights.

Performance history
It was first staged on 10 February 1871 at the Theater an der Wien in Vienna, Austria. It was initially granted a warm reception by Vienna's theatre-going public, but the press was more divided in opinion. Typical published reactions were: "It consists of dance music on which Strauss has overlaid text and characters ... A man of Strauss' reputation should never have allowed his name to be associated with such a venture ... It is an interesting production and is a foretaste of great things to come."

The work was successfully restaged in Paris in 1875 under the title Queen Indigo, then, rechristened A Night on the Bosphorus, it was presented in London in 1876.

Finally, after Strauss' death, the operetta was entirely reworked in 1906 by Max Steiner and staged in Vienna under yet another title, The Thousand and One Nights, which is also the title of one of Strauss' waltzes ("Tausend und eine Nacht", op. 346) of which the melodies were drawn from the stage work.

Max Schönherr later reworked the ballet music from this work into a concert piece, and this version has been recorded.

Roles

References
Notes

Sources

Operas by Johann Strauss II
German-language operettas
1871 operas
Operas based on fairy tales
Works based on One Thousand and One Nights
Operas